This list of sequenced animal genomes contains animal species for which complete genome sequences have been assembled, annotated and published. Substantially complete draft genomes are included, but not partial genome sequences or organelle-only sequences.

Porifera
 Amphimedon queenslandica, a sponge (2009)
 Stylissa carteri (2016)
 Ephydatia muelleri (2020)
 Xestospongia testudinaria (2016)

Ctenophora
 Mnemiopsis leidyi (Ctenophora), (order Lobata) (2012/2013)
 Hormiphora californensis (Ctenophora) (2021)
 Pleurobrachia bachei (Ctenophora) (2014)

Placozoa
 Trichoplax adhaerens, a Placozoan (2008)
 Hoilungia hongkongensis, nov. gen H13 Placozoan (2018)

Cnidaria
 Hydra vulgaris, (previously Hydra magnipapillata), a model hydrozoan (2010)
 Nematostella vectensis, a model anemone (starlet sea anemone) (2007)
 Aiptasia pallida, a sea anemone (2015)
 Renilla muelleri, an octocoral (2017, 2019)
 Stylophora pistillata, a coral  (2017)
 Aurelia aurita, moon jellyfish (2019)
 Clytia hemisphaerica, Hydrozoan jellyfish (2019)
 Myxobolus honghuensis (2022)
 Nemopilema nomurai, Nomura jellyfish (2019)
 Rhopilema esculentum, Flame jellyfish (2020)
 Cassiopea xamachana (Scyphozoa) (2019)
 Alatina alata (Cubozoa) (2019)
 Calvadosia cruxmelitensis (Staurozoa) (2019)
 Dendronephthya gigantea, an octocoral (2019)
Acropora acuminata (2020)
Acropora awi (2020)
Acropora cytherea, Table coral  (2020)
Acropora digitifera, a coral  (2011)
Acropora echinata (2020)
Acropora florida, branching staghorn coral(2020)
Acropora gemmifera (2021)
Acropora hyacinthus, Brush coral (2020)
Acropora intermedia, Noble Staghorn Coral (2020)
Acropora microphthalma (2020)
Acropora muricata, Staghorn coral (2020)
Acropora nasta, branching staghorn coral (2020)
Acropora selago, Green Selago Acropora (2020)
Acropora tenuis, Purple Tipped Acropora (2020)
Acropora yongei ,Yonge's staghorn coral  (2020)
Astreopora myriophthalma, Porous star coral (2020)
Lophelia pertusa, Deepwater White Coral (2023)
Montipora cactus (2020)
Montipora capitata, Rice coral (2022)
Montipora efflorescens, Velvet coral  (2020)
Orbicella faveolata, mountainous star coral (2016)
Pocillopora acuta, Hosoeda Hanayasai coral (2022)
Pocillopora damicornis, cauliflower coral (2018)
Pocillopora meandrina, Cauliflower coral (2022)
Porites astreoides, Mustard hill coral (2022)
Porites compressa, Finger coral (2022)

Deuterostomia

Hemichordates 
 Saccoglossus kowalevskii, Enteropneusta (2015)
 Ptychodera flava, Enteropneusta (2015)

Echinoderms
 Acanthaster planci, starfish (2014)
 Apostichopus japonicus, sea cucumber (2017)
 Plazaster borealis, Octopus starfish (2022)
 Strongylocentrotus purpuratus, a sea urchin and model deuterostome (2006)

Tunicates
 Ciona intestinalis, a tunicate (2002)
 Ciona savignyi, a tunicate (2007)
 Oikopleura dioica, a larvacean (2001).

Cephalochordates
 Branchiostoma floridae, a lancelet (2008)

Cyclostomes
 Petromyzon marinus, a lamprey (2009, 2013)

Cartilaginous fish
 Callorhinchus milii, an elephant shark (2007)
 Carcharodon carcharias, Great white shark (2018)
Chiloscyllium plagiosum, Whitespotted bamboo shark (2020)
 Chiloscyllium punctatum, Brownbanded bamboo shark (2018)
 Rhincodon typus, Whale shark (2017)
 Scyliorhinus torazame, Cloudy catshark (2018)

Bony fish 
 Order Anabantiformes
Betta splendens, Siamese fighting fish (2018)
 Helostoma temminkii, Kissing gourami  (2020)
 Order Anguilliformes
 Anguilla anguilla, European Eel (2012)
 Anguilla japonica, Japanese Eel (2022)
 Order Beloniformes
 Oryzias latipes, medaka (2007)
 Order Callionymiformes
Callionymus lyra, common dragonet (2020)
 Order Carangiformes
 Caranx ignobilis, Giant trevally (2022)
 Caranx melampygus, Bluefin trevally (2021)
 Pseudocaranx georgianus, New Zealand trevally (2021)
 Order Centrarchiformes
 Oplegnathus fasciatus, barred knifejaw (2019)
 Order Characiformes
 Astyanax mexicanus, Mexican tetra (2014)
 Astyanax mexicanus, Mexican cavefish (2021)
Colossoma macropomum, Tambaqui (2021)
 Order Cichliformes 
 Oreochromis niloticus, Nile tilapia (2019)
 Metriaclima zeb, Lake Malawi cichlid (2019)
 Order Clupeiformes
 Clupea harengus, Atlantic herring (2020)
 Coilia nasus, Japanese grenadier anchovy (2020)
 Sardina pilchardus, European sardine (2019)
 Order Coelacanthiformes
 Latimeria chalumnae, West Indian Ocean coelacanth and oldest known living lineage of Sarcopterygii (2013)
 Order Cypriniformes
Anabarilius grahami Regan, Kanglang fish (2018)
 Danio rerio, a zebrafish (2007)
 Oxygymnocypris stewartii,(2019)
 Megalobrama amblycephala, blunt snout bream (2017)
 Rhodeus ocellatus, Rosy bitterling (2020)
Triplophysa bleekeri, Tibetan stone loach (2020)
 Pseudobrama simoni (2020)
 Order Cyprinodontiformes
 Fundulus catenatus, Northern studfish (2020)
Fundulus olivaceus, Blackspotted topminnow (2020)
Fundulus nottii, Bayou topminnow (2020)
Fundulus xenicus, Diamond killifish (2020)
Gambusia affinis, western mosquitofish (2020)
Heterandria formosa, least killifish (2019)
 Micropoecilia picta, Picta swamp guppy (2021) 
 Xiphophorus maculatus, platyfish (2013)
 Nothobranchius furzeri,  turquoise killifish (2015)
 Order Dipnoi
Protopterus annectens, West-African lungfish (2021)
 Order Esociformes
 Esox lucius, northern pike (2014)
 Order Gadiformes
 Gadus macrocephalus, Pacific cod (2022)
 Gadus morhua, Atlantic cod (2011))
 Order Gasterosteiformes
 Gasterosteus aculeatus, three-spined stickleback (2006, 2012)
 Order Gobiiformes
 Oxyeleotris marmorata, marble goby (2020)
 Periophthalmus modestus, shuttles hoppfish or shuttles mudskipper (2022)
 Order Gymnotiformes
Electrophorus electricus, electric eel (2014)
Order Lampriformes
 Lampris Incognitus, Smalleye Pacific Opah (2021)
 Order Lepisosteiformes
 Lepisosteus oculatus, spotted gar
 Order Osmeriformes
 Neosalanx tangkahkeii, chinese icefish (2015)
 Protosalanx hyalocranius, clearhead icefish (2017)
 Order Osteoglossiformes
 Heterotis niloticus, African arowana (2020)
 Paramormyrops kingsleyae, Mormyrid Electric Fish (2017)
 Scleropages formosus, Asian arowana (2016)
 Order Perciformes
 Centropyge bicolor, bicolor angelfish (2021)
Chaetodon trifasciatus, melon butterflyfish (2020)
 Channa argus, northern snakehead (2017)
Channa maculata, blotched snakehead (2021)
Chelmon rostratus, copperband butterflyfish (2020)
Dissostichus mawsoni, Antarctic toothfish (2019)
Eleginops maclovinus, Patagonian robalo (2019)
Epinephelus moara, kelp grouper (2021)
Larimichthys crocea, large yellow croaker (2014)
Lutjanus campechanus, Northern red snapper (2020)
 Naso vlamingii, bignose unicornfish (2020)
Parachaenichthys charcoti, Antarctic dragonfish (2017)
Seriola dumerili, Greater amberjack (2017)
Sillago sinica, chinese sillago (2018)
Siniperca knerii, Big-Eye Mandarin Fish (2020)
Sparus aurata, gilt-head bream (2018)
 Order Salmoniformes
 Salmo salar, Atlantic salmon (2016)
 Oncorhynchus mykiss, rainbow trout (2014)
 Oncorhynchus tshawytscha, Chinook salmon (2018)
 Salvelinus namaycush, Lake Trout (2021)
 Order Scorpaeniformes
 Sebastes schlegelii, Black rockfish (2018)
 Order Siluriformes
 Ictalurus punctatus, channel catfish (2016)
Silurus glanis, Wels catfish (2020)
 Pangasianodon hypophthalmus, Iridescent shark catfish (2021)
 Order Spariformes
 Datnioides pulcher, Siamese tigerfish (2020)
 Datnioides undecimradiatus, Mekong tiger perch (2020)
 Order Tetraodontiformes
 Diodon holocanthus, Long-spine porcupinefish (2020)
 Mola mola, ocean sunfish (2016)
Takifugu rubripes, a puffer fish (International Fugu Genome Consortium 2002)
Tetraodon nigroviridis, a puffer fish (2004)

Amphibians
 Ambystoma mexicanum, axolotl (2018)
 Leptobrachium leishanense, Leishan Moustache toad (2019)
Limnodynastes dumerilii dumerilii, Eastern banjo frog (2020)
Nanorana parkeri, High Himalaya frog (2015)
 Oophaga pumilio, Strawberry poison-dart frog (2018)
 Platyplectrum ornatum, Ornate burrowing frog (2021)
Pyxicephalus adspersus, African bullfrog (2018)
 Rana [Lithobates] catesbeiana, North American bullfrog (2017 )
 Rana kukunoris, Plateau brown frog (2023) 
 Rhinella marina, Cane toad (2018)
 Vibrissaphora ailaonica, Moustache toad (2019)
 Xenopus tropicalis, western clawed frog (2010)

Reptiles
 Order Crocodylia
 Alligator mississippiensis, American alligator (2012)
 Alligator sinensis, Chinese alligator (2013, 2014)
 Crocodylus porosus, salt water crocodile (2012)
 Gavialis gangeticus, Indian gharial (2012)
 Order Rhynchocephalia
Sphenodon punctatus, tuatara (2020)
 Order Squamata
 Anolis carolinensis JBL SC #1, Carolina anole (2011)
 Arizona elegans occidentalis, California glossy snake (2022)
 Bothrops jararaca, Jararaca lancehead, (2021)
 Bungarus multicinctus, Many-banded krait (2022)
 Deinagkistrodon acutus, five-pacer viper (2016)
 Dopasia gracilis, Burmese glass lizard, (2015)
 Emydocephalus ijimae, Ijima's turtle-headed sea snake, (2019)
 Eublepharis macularius, Leopard gecko (2016)
Hydrophis curtus, Shaw's Sea Snake (2020)
 Hydrophis melanocephalus, slender-necked sea snake, (2019)
 Laticauda colubrina, yellow-lipped sea krait, (2019)
 Laticauda laticaudata, blue-lipped sea krait, (2019)
 Naja naja, Indian cobra (2020)
 Ophiophagus hannah, king cobra (2013)
 Pantherophis guttatus, corn snake (2014)
 Pogona vitticeps, Central bearded dragon (2015)
 Python bivittatus, Burmese python (2013)
 Python regius, Ball python (2020)
 Salvator merianae, Argentine black and white tegu (2018)
Sceloporus undulatus, Eastern fence lizard (2021)
 Shinisaurus crocodilurus, Chinese crocodile lizard, (2017)
Zootoca vivipara, Viviparous lizard (2020)
 Order Testudines (Chelonii)
 Actinemys marmorata, Northwestern Pond Turtle (2022)
 Aldabrachelys gigantea, Aldabra giant tortoise (2019 draft, 2022 chromosome scale)
 Chelonia mydas, green sea turtle (2013)
 Chelonoidis abingdonii, Pinta Island giant tortoise (2019)
 Chelonoidis phantasticus, Fernandina Island Galapagos giant tortoise (2022)
 Chrysemys picta bellii, western painted turtle (2013)
 Pelodiscus sinensis, Chinese softshell turtle (2013)
 Platysternon megacephalum, Big-headed turtle (2019)

Birds
 Order Accipitriformes
 Haliaeetus albicilla, white-tailed eagle (2014)
 Haliaeetus leucocephalus, bald eagle (2014)
 Aegypius monachus, cinereous vulture (2015)
 Aquila chrysaetos, golden eagle (2018)
 Order Anseriformes
 Anas platyrhynchos, mallard duck (or wild duck) (2013)
 Aythya fuligula, tufted duck (2021)
 Order Apodiformes
 Chaetura pelagica, chimney swift (2014)
 Order Apterygiformes
Apteryx mantelli, North Island brown kiwi (2015)
 Order Bucerotiformes
 Buceros rhinoceros silvestris, rhinoceros hornbill (2014)
 Order Caprimulgiformes
 Antrostomus carolinensis, chuck-will's-widow (2014)
 Order Cariamiformes
 Cariama cristata, red-legged seriema (2014)
 Order Cathartiformes
 Cathartes aura, turkey vulture (2014)
 Order Charadriiformes
 Charadrius vociferus, killdeer (2014)
 Himantopus novaezelandiae, kakī/black stilt (2019)
 Himantopus himantopus, pied stilt (2019)
 Recurvirostra avosetta, pied avocet (2019)
 Order Ciconiiformes
 Nipponia nippon, crested ibis (2014)
 Order Coliiformes
 Colius striatus, speckled mousebird (2014)
 Order Columbiformes
 Columba livia, pigeon (2014)
 Order Coraciiformes
 Merops nubicus, carmine bee-eater (2014)
 Order Cuculiformes
 Cuculus canorus, common cuckoo (2014)
 Tauraco erythrolophus, red-crested turaco (2014)
 Order Eurypygiformes
 Eurypyga helias, sunbittern (2014)
 Order Falconiformes
 Falco cherrug, saker falcon (2013)
 Falco peregrinus, peregrine falcon (2013)
 Order Galliformes
Arborophila rufipectus, Sichuan Partridge (2019)
Gallus gallus, chicken (2004)
Meleagris gallopavo, domesticated turkey (2011)
 Numida meleagris, helmeted guinea fowl (2019)
 Pavo cristatus, Indian peafowl (2018)
 Pavo muticus, Green peafowl (2022)
Phasianus colchicus, Common Pheasant (2019)
Syrmaticus mikado, mikado pheasant (2018)
Tetrao tetrix, black grouse (2014)
 Order Gaviiformes
 Gavia stellata, red-throated loon (2014)
 Order Gruiformes
 Balearica regulorum gibbericeps, grey crowned-crane (2014)
 Chlamydotis macqueenii, MacQueen's bustard (2014)
 Order Leptosomiformes
 Leptosomus discolor, cuckoo-roller (2014)
 Order Mesitornithiformes
 Mesitornis unicolor, brown mesite (2014)
 Order Opisthocomiformes
 Opisthocomus hoazin, hoatzin (2014)
 Order Passeriformes
 Acanthisitta chloris, rifleman (2014)
 Corvus brachyrhynchos, American crow (2014)
 Corvus hawaiiensis, Hawaiian crow (2018)
 Eopsaltria australis, Eastern yellow robin (2019)
 Ficedula albicollis, collared flycatcher (2012)
 Ficedula hypoleuca, pied flycatcher (2012)
 Geospiza fortis, medium ground-finch (2014)
 Hirundo rustica, barn swallow (2018)
 Lonchura striata domestica, Society finch (2018)
 Manacus vitellinus, golden-collared manakin (2014)
 Lycocorax pyrrhopterus, Paradise-crow (2019)
 Malurus cyaneus, superb fairywren (2021)
 Manacus vitellinus, golden-collared manakin (2014)
Notiomystis cincta, stichbird or hihi (2019)
 Paradisaea rubra, red bird-of-paradise (2019)
 Pteridophora alberti, king of Saxony bird-of-paradise (2019)
 Ptiloris paradiseus, paradise riflebird (2019)
 Taeniopygia guttata, zebra finch (2010)
 Order Pelecaniformes
 Egretta garzetta, little egret (2014)
 Pelecanus crispus, Dalmatian pelican (2014)
 Order Phaethontiformes
 Phaethon lepturus, white-tailed tropicbird (2014)
 Order Phoenicopteriformes
 Phoenicopterus ruber ruber, American flamingo (2014)
 Order Piciformes
 Picoides pubescens, downy woodpecker (2014)
 Order Podicipediformes
 Podiceps cristatus, great crested grebe (2014)
 Order Procellariiformes
 Fulmarus glacialis, northern fulmar (2014)
 Order Pterocliformes
 Pterocles gutturalis, yellow-throated sandgrouse (2014)
 Order Psittaciformes
 Amazona leucocephala, Cuban amazon (2019)
 Amazona ventralis, Hispaniolan amazon (2019)
 Amazona vittata, Puerto Rican parrot (2012)
 Ara macao, Scarlet macaw (2013)
 Cyanoramphus malherbi, kākāriki karaka (2020)
 Melopsittacus undulatus, budgerigar (2014)
 Nestor notabilis, kea (2014)
 Order Struthioniformes
 Struthio camelus australis, common ostrich (2014)
 Order Sphenisciformes
 Aptenodytes forsteri, emperor penguin (2014)
Aptenodytes patagonicus, king penguin (2019)
Eudyptes chrysocome, Western rockhopper penguin (2019) 
Eudyptes chrysolophus chrysolophus,  Macaroni penguin (2019) 
Eudyptes chrysolophus schlegeli, Royal penguin (2019) 
Eudyptes filholi, Eastern rockhopper penguin (2019) 
Eudyptes moseleyi, Northern rockhopper penguin (2019) 
Eudyptes pachyrhynchus, Fiordland-crested penguin (2019) 
Eudyptes robustus, Snares-crested penguin (2019) 
Eudyptes sclateri, Erect-crested penguin (2019) 
Eudyptula minor albosignata, white-flippered penguin (2019) 
Eudyptula minor minor, little blue penguin (2019) 
Eudyptula novaehollandiae, fairy penguin (2019)
Megadyptes antipodes antipodes, yellow eyed penguin or hoiho (2019) 
Pygoscelis adeliae, Adélie penguin (2014)
Pygoscelis antarctica, chinstrap penguin (2019)
Pygoscelis papua, gentoo penguin (2019)
Spheniscus demersus, African penguin (2019) 
Spheniscus humboldti, Humboldt penguin (2019) 
Spheniscus magellanicus, Magellanic penguin (2019) 
Spheniscus mendiculus, Galápagos penguin (2019) 
 Order Strigiformes
 Tyto alba, barn owl (2014)
 Strix occidentalis caurina, northern spotted owl (2017)
 Strix varia, Barred owl (2017)
 Order Suliformes
 Nannopterum auritum, double-crested cormorant (2017)
 Nannopterum brasilianum, Neotropic cormorant (2017)
 Phalacrocorax carbo, great cormorant (2014)
 Nannopterum harrisi, Galapagos cormorant (2017)
 Urile pelagicus, pelagic cormorant (2017)
 Order Tinamiformes
 Tinamus guttatus, white-throated tinamou (2014)
 Order Trochiliformes
 Calypte anna, Anna's hummingbird (2014)
 Order Trogoniformes
 Apaloderma vittatum, bar-tailed trogon (2014)

Mammals
 Subclass Prototheria, Order Monotremata
Family Ornithorhynchidae
 Ornithorhynchus anatinus, platypus (2007, complete 2021)
 Family Tachyglossidae
 Tachyglossus aculeatus, short-beaked echidna (2021)
 Subclass Theria (marsupials and placental mammals)
 Infraclass Metatheria (marsupials)
 Order Didelphimorphia, Family Didelphidae (opossums)
 Monodelphis domestica, gray short-tailed opossum (2007)
 Order Dasyuromorphia
 Family Dasyuridae
 Antechinus stuartii, brown antechinus (2020)
Sarcophilus harrisii, Tasmanian devil
Sminthopsis crassicaudata, fat-tailed dunnart (ongoing)
Dasyurus hallucatus, northern quoll (ongoing)
 Family Myrmecobiidae
 Myrmecobius fasciatus, numbat (ongoing)
 Family Thylacinidae
 Thylacinus cynocephalus, thylacine
 Order Peramelemorphia
 Family Peramelidae
 Perameles gunnii, eastern barred bandicoot (ongoing)
 Family Thylacomyidae
 Macrotis lagotis, greater bilby (ongoing)
 Order Notoryctemorphia, Family Notoryctidae
 Notoryctes typhlops, southern marsupial mole (ongoing)
 Order Diprotodontia
 Family Macropodidae
 Macropus eugenii, tammar wallaby (2011)
 Petrogale penicillata, brush-tailed rock-wallaby (ongoing)
 Family Potoroidae
 Bettongia gaimardi, eastern bettong (ongoing)
 Bettongia penicillata ogilbyi, woylie (2021)
 Family Petauridae
 Gymnobelideus leadbeateri, Leadbeater's possum (ongoing)
 Family Burramyidae
 Burramys parvus, mountain pygmy possum (ongoing)
 Family Vombatidae
 Vombatus ursinus, common wombat (ongoing)
 Family Phascolarctidae
 Phascolarctos cinereus, koala (2013 draft)
 Infraclass Eutheria (placental mammals)

 Order Erinaceomorpha, Family Erinaceidae
 Erinaceus europaeus, western European hedgehog
 Order Eulipotyphla, Family Solenodontidae
Solenodon parodoxus, Hispaniolan solenodon (2018)
Order Chiroptera
 Family Megadermatidae
 Megaderma lyra, greater false vampire bat (2013)
 Family Mormoopidae
 Pteronotus parnellii, Parnell's mustached bat (2013)
 Family Pteropodidae
 Pteropus vampyrus, fruit bat (2012)
 Eidolon helvum, Old World fruit bat (2013)
 Family Rhinolophidae
 Rhinolophus ferrumequinum, greater horseshoe bat (2013)
 Family Vespertilionidae
 Myotis lucifugus, little brown bat (2010))
 Family Phyllostomidae
Leptonycteris yerbabuenae, long nosed bat (2020)
 Leptonycteris nivalis, greater long nosed bat (2020)
 Musonycteris harrisoni, banana bat (2020)
 Artibeus jamaicensis, Jamaican fruit bat (2020)
 Macrotus waterhousii, Waterhouse's leaf-nosed bat (2020)
 Order Primates
 Family Galagidae
 Otolemur garnettii, small-eared galago, or bushbaby

 Family Cercopithecidae
 Macaca mulatta, rhesus macaque (2007 & Chinese rhesus macaque Macaca mulatta lasiota in 2011)
 Macaca fascicularis, Cynomolgus or crab-eating macaque (2011)
Papio anubis, olive baboon (2020)
Papio cynocephalus, yellow baboon (2016)
 Rhinopithecus roxellana, golden snub-nosed monkey (2019)
 Family Hominidae
 Subfamily Ponginae
 Pongo pygmaeus/Pongo abelii, orangutan (Borneo/Sumatra) (2011)
 Subfamily Homininae
 Gorilla gorilla, western gorilla (2012)
 Homo sapiens, modern human (draft 2001, whole genome 2022)
 Homo neanderthalensis, Neanderthal (draft 2010)
 Pan troglodytes, chimpanzee (2005)
 Pan paniscus, bonobo (2012)

 Family Callitrichidae
 Callithrix jacchus, marmoset (2010, whole genome 2014)
 Order Carnivora
 Family Felidae
 Acinonyx jubatus, cheetah (2015)
 Felis catus, cat (2007)
 Panthera leo, lion (2013)
 Panthera pardus, Amur leopard (2016)
 Panthera tigris tigris,  Siberian tiger (2013)
 Panthera tigris tigris, Bengal tiger (2013)
 Panthera uncia, snow leopard (2013)
 Prionailurus bengalensis, leopard cat (2016)
 Family Canidae
 Canis familiaris, dog (2005)
 Canis lupus lupus, wolf (2017).
 Lycaon pictus, african wild dog (2018)
 Family Ursidae
 Ailuropoda melanoleuca, giant panda (2010)
 Ursus arctos ssp. horribilis, Grizzly bear (2018)
 Ursus americanus, American black bear (2019)
 Ursus maritimus, Polar bear (2014)
 Family Odobenidae
 Odobenus rosmarus, walrus (2015)
 Family Mustelidae
 Enhydra lutris kenyoni, sea otter (2017)
 Mustela erminea, stoat (2018)
 Mustela furo, ferret (2014)
 Pteronura brasiliensis, giant otter (2019)
 Order Proboscidea, Family Elephantidae
 Elephas maximus, Asian elephant (2015)
 Loxodonta africana, African bush elephant (2009)
 Loxodonta cyclotis, African forest elephant (2018)
 Order Sirenia (sea cows)
 Family Trichechidae
 Trichechus manatus, West Indian manatee (2015)
 Order Perissodactyla (odd-toed ungulates), Family Equidae
 Equus caballus, horse (2009 2018)
 Order Cetartiodactyla (even-toed ungulates and cetaceans)
 Family Antilocapridae
 Antilocapra americana, pronghorn (2019)
Family Balaenidae
Balaena mysticetus, bowhead whale (2015)
Eubalaena glacialis, North Atlantic right whale (2018)
Family Balaenopteridae
 Balaenoptera acutorostrata, common minke whale (2014)
Balaenoptera borealis, sei whale (2018)
Balaenoptera musculus, blue whale (2018)
 Balaenoptera physalus, fin whale (2014)
Megaptera novaeangliae, humpback whale (2018)
 Family Bovidae
 Ammotragus lervia, Barbary sheep (2019)
 Antidorcas marsupialis, Springbox (2019)
 Bison bonasus, European bison (2017)
 Bos grunniens, yak 2012
 Bos primigenius indicus, zebu or Brahman cattle (2012)
 Bos primigenius taurus, cow 2009
 Bubalus bubalis, river buffalo (2017)
 Capra ibex, Goats (2019)
 Cephalophus harveyi, Harvey's duiker (2019)
 Connochaetes taurinus, blue wildebeest (2019)
 Damaliscus lunatus, common tsessebe (2019)
 Gazella thomsoni, Thomson's gazelle (2019)
 Hippotragus niger, Sable Antelope (2019)
 Kobus ellipsiprymnus, Waterbuck (2019)
 Litocranius walleri, Gerenuk (2019)
 Oreotragus oreotragus, Klipspringer (2019)
 Oryx gazella, Gemsbok (2019)
 Ourebia ourebi, Oribi (2019)
 Ovis ammon, Argali (2019)
 Ovis ammon polii, marco polo sheep (2017)
 Nanger granti, Grant's gazelle (2019)
 Neotragus moschatus, Suni (2019)
 Neotragus pygmaeus, Royal antelope (2019)
 Philantomba maxwellii, Maxwell's duiker (2019)
 Procapra przewalskii, Przewalski's gazelle (2019)
 Pseudois nayaur, Bharal (2019)
 Raphicerus campestris, Steenbox (2019)
 Redunca redunca, Bohor reedbuck (2019)
 Syncerus caffer, African buffalo (2019)
 Sylvicapra grimmia, common duiker (2019)
 Tragelaphus, Spiral-horned bovine (2019)
 Tragelaphus buxtoni, Mountain nyala (2019)
 Tragelaphus strepsiceros, Greater kudu (2019)
 Tragelaphus imberbis, Lesser kudu (2019)
 Tragelaphus spekii, Sitatunga (2019)
 Tragelaphus scriptus, Bushbuck (2019)
 Taurotragus oryx, Common eland (2019)
 Family Cervidae
 Cervus albirostris, Tharold's deer (2019)
 Elaphurus davidianus, Père David's deer  (2018)
 Muntiacus crinifrons, hairy-fronted muntjac (2019)
 Muntiacus muntjak, Indian muntjac (2019)
 Muntiacus reevesi, Reeves's muntjac (2019)
Odocoileus hemionus, mule deer (2021)
 Rangifer tarandus, Reindeer (2017)
Family Delphinidae
 Tursiops truncatus, bottlenosed dolphin (2012)
 Neophocaena phocaenoides, finless porpoise (2014)
 Orcinus orca, killer whale (2015)
 Sousa chinensis, Indo-Pacific humpback dolphin (2019)
Family Eschrichtiidae
Eschrichtius robustus, gray whale (2018)
 Family Giraffidae
 Giraffa camelopardalis, Giraffe (2019)
 Giraffa camelopardalis tippelskirchi, Masai giraffe (2019)
 Okapia johnstoni, Okapi (2019)
Family Monodontidae
 Delphinapterus, beluga whale (2017)
 Family Moschidae
 Moschus berezovskii, forest musk deer (2018)
 Moschus chrysogaster, Alpine musk deer (2019)
Family Physeteridae
 Physeter macrocephalus, sperm whale (2019)
Family Suidae
 Sus scrofa, pig (2012)
 Family Tragulidae
 Tragulus javanicus, Java mouse-deer (2019)
 Order Rodentia

 Family Caviidae
 Hydrochoerus hydrochaeris, capybara (2018)
 Family Cricetidae
 Microtus montanus, Montane vole (2021)
 Microtus richardsoni, North American Water Vole (2021)
 Peromyscus leucopus, white-footed mouse (2019)
 Family Muridae
 Mastomys coucha, Southern multimammate mouse (2019) 
 Mus musculus Strain: C57BL/6J, mouse (2002)
 Rattus norvegicus, rat (2004)

 Order Lagomorpha
 Family Leporidae
 Oryctolagus cuniculus, European rabbit (2010)

Protostomia

Insects
 Order Blattodea
 Blattella germanica, German cockroach (2018)
 Periplaneta americana, American cockroach (2018)
 Zootermopsis nevadensis, a dampwood termite (2014
 Cryptotermes secundus, a drywood termite(2018)
 Macrotermes natalensis, a higher termite (2014
 Order Coleoptera
 Dendroctonus ponderosae Hopkins, beetle (mountain pine beetle) (2013)
 Aquatica lateralis, Japanese aquatic firefly "Heike-botaru" (firefly) (2018)
 Photinus pyralis, Big Dipper firefly (2018)
 Protaetia brevitarsis, White-spotted flower chafer (2019)
 Tribolium castaneum Strain:GA-2, beetle (red flour beetle) (2008)
 Allomyrina dichotoma, Japanese rhinoceros beetle (2022)
 Order Collembola
 Family Isotomidae
 Desoria tigrina, (2021)
 Family Sminthurididae
 Sminthurides aquaticus, (2021)
 Order Diptera
 Family Calliphoridae
 Aldrichina grahami, Forensic blowfly (2020)
 Family Chironomidae
 Dasypogon diadema, Hunting Robber fly (2019)
 Parochlus steinend, Antarctic winged midge (2017)
 Proctacanthus coquilletti, Assassin fly (2017)
 Family Culicidae (mosquitoes)
 Aedes aegypti Strain:LVPib12, mosquito (vector of dengue fever, etc.) (2007)
 Aedes albopictus (2015)
 Anopheles darlingi
 Anopheles gambiae Strain: PEST, mosquito (vector of malaria) (2002)
 Anopheles gambiae Strain: M, mosquito (vector of malaria) (2010)
 Anopheles gambiae Strain: S, mosquito (vector of malaria) (2010))
 Anopheles sinensis, mosquito (vector of vivax malaria, lymphatic filariasis and Setaria infections), (2014)
 Anopheles stephensii
 Anopheles arabiensis (2015)
 Anopheles quadriannulatus (2015)
 Anopheles merus (2015)
 Anopheles melas (2015)
 Anopheles christyi (2015)
 Anopheles epiroticus (2015)
 Anopheles maculatus (2015)
 Anopheles culicifacies (2015)
 Anopheles minimus (2015)
 Anopheles funestus (2015)2019
 Anopheles dirus (2015)
 Anopheles farauti (2015)
 Anopheles atroparvus (2015)
 Anopheles sinensis (2015)
 Anopheles albimanus (2015)
 Culex quinquefasciatus, mosquito (vector of West Nile virus, filariasis etc.) (2010)
 Family Drosophilidae (fruit flies)
 Drosophila albomicans, fruit fly (2012)
 Drosophila ananassae, fruit fly (2007)
 Drosophila biarmipes, fruit fly (2011)
 Drosophila bipectinata, fruit fly (2011)
 Drosophila erecta, fruit fly (2007)
 Drosophila elegans, fruit fly (2011)
 Drosophila eugracilis, fruit fly (2011)
 Drosophila ficusphila, fruit fly (2011)
 Drosophila grimshawi, fruit fly (2007)
 Drosophila kikkawai, fruit fly (2011)
 Drosophila melanogaster, fruit fly (model organism) (2000)
 Drosophila mojavensis, fruit fly (2007)
 Drosophila neotestacea, fruit fly (transcriptome 2014)
 Drosophila persimilis, fruit fly (2007)
 Drosophila pseudoobscura, fruit fly (2005)
 Drosophila rhopaloa, fruit fly (2011)
 Drosophila santomea, fruit fly
 Drosophila sechellia, fruit fly (2007)
 Drosophila simulans, fruit fly (2007)
 Drosophila takahashi, fruit fly (2011)
 Drosophila virilis, fruit fly (2007)
 Drosophila willistoni, fruit fly (2007)
 Drosophila yakuba, fruit fly (2007)
 Family Phoridae
 Megaselia abdita, scuttle fly (transcriptome 2013)
 Family Psychodidae (drain flies)
 Clogmia albipunctata, moth midge (transcriptome 2013)
 Family Sarcophagidae (flesh flies)
 Sarcophaga Bullata, Flesh fly (2019)
 Family Syrphidae (hoverflies)
 Episyrphus balteatus, hoverfly (transcriptome 2011)
 Order Hemiptera
 Acyrthosiphon pisum, aphid (pea aphid) (2010)
 Ericerus pela, Chinese wax scale insect (2019)
 Laodelphax striatellus, small brown planthopper (2017)
 Lycorma delicatula, spotted lanternfly (2019)
 Rhodnius prolixus, kissing-bug (2015)
 Rhopalosiphum maidis, Corn leaf aphid (2019)
 Sitobion miscanthi, Indian grain aphid (2019)
 Triatoma rubrofasciata, assassin bug (2019)
 Order Hymenoptera
 Acromyrmex echinatior colony Ae372, ant (Panamanian leafcutter) (2011)
 Apis mellifera, bee (honey bee), (model for eusocial behavior) (2006)
 Atta cephalotes, ant (leaf-cutter ant) (2011)
 Camponotus floridanus, ant (2010)
 Cerapachys biroi, ant (clonal raider ant)(2014)
 Euglossa dilemma, Green orchid bee (2017)
 Harpegnathos saltator, ant (2010)
 Lasius niger, ant (black garden ant)(2017)
 Linepithema humile, ant (Argentine ant) (2011)
 Nasonia giraulti, wasp (parasitoid wasp) (2010)
 Nasonia longicornis, wasp (parasitoid wasp) (2010)
 Nasonia vitripennis, wasp (parasitoid wasp; model organism) (2010)
 Nomia Melanderi, Alkali bee (2019)
 Pogonomyrmex barbatus, ant (red harvester ant) (2011)
 Solenopsis invicta, ant (fire ant) (2011)
 Order Lepidoptera
 Achalarus lyciades, Hoary Edge Skipper (2017)
 Antharaea yamamai, Japanese oak silk moth (2019)
Arctia plantaginis, Wood tiger moth (2020)
 Bicyclus anynana, squinting bush brown (2017)
 Bombyx mori Strain:p50T, moth (domestic silk worm) (2004)
 Calycopis cecrops, Red-Banded Groundstreak (2016)
 Calycopis isobeon, Dusky-Blue Groundstreak (2016)
 Cydia pomonella, codling moth (2019)
 Danaus plexippus, monarch butterfly) (2011)
 Heliconius melpomene, butterfly (2012)
 Melitaea cinxia, Glanville fritillary butterfly (2014)
 Megathymus ursus violae, bear giant skipper butterfly (2018)
 Papilio bianor, Chinese peacock butterfly (2019)
 Pieris rapae, small cabbage white butterfly (2016)
 Plodia interpunctella, Indianmeal moth (2022)
 Plutella xylostella, moth (diamondback moth) (2013)
 Spodoptera frugiperda, Fall armyworm (2017)
 Eudocima phalonia, fruit-piercing moth (2017)
 Order Orthoptera
 Locusta migratoria, migratory locust (2014)
 Schistocerca gregaria, desert locust (2020)
 Gryllus bimaculatus, two-spotted cricket (2021) 
 Order Phthiraptera
 Pediculus humanus, louse (sucking louse; parasite) (2010)
 Psocoptera
 Liposcelis brunnea, booklouse (2022)
 Order Trichoptera
 Eubasilissa regina, purple caddisfly (2022,)
 Stenopsyche tienmushanensisi, Caddisfly (2018)

Crustaceans
 Acartia tonsa dana, cosmopolitan calanoid copepod (2019)
 Cherax quadricarinatus, Red claw crayfish (2020)
 Daphnia pulex, water flea (2007)
 Eulimnadia texana, Clam Shrimp (2018)
Macrobrachium nipponense, oriental river prawn (2021)
 Neocaridina denticulata, shrimp (2014)
 Parhyale hawaiensis, amphipod (2016)
 Pollicipes pollicipes, Gooseneck barnacle (2022)
 Portunus trituberculatus, swimming crab (2020)
 Procambarus virginalis, marbled crayfish (2018)
 Tigriopus kingsejongensis, antarctic-endemic copepod (2017)

Chelicerates
 Limulus polyphemus, Atlantic horseshoe crab (2014)
 Carcinoscorpius rotundicauda, mangrove horseshoe crab (2020)

Of which Arachnids:
 Acanthoscurria geniculata, Brazilian whiteknee tarantula (2014)
Argiope bruennichi, European wasp spider (2021)
 Dysdera silvatica, Canary Island nocturnal endemic woodlouse spider (2019)
 Ixodes scapularis, (deer tick) (2016)
 Latrodectus elegans, Black widow spider (2022)
 Mesobuthus martensii, Chinese scorpion (2013)
 Nephila clavipes, (golden silk orb-weaver) (2017)
 Parasteatoda tepidariorum, (common house spider) (2017)
 Stegodyphus mimosarum, African social velvet spider (2014)
 Tetranychus urticae, spider mite (2011)
 Tropilaelaps mercedesae, (honeybee mite) (2017)

Myriapoda
 Strigamia maritima, centipede

Tardigrades
 Hypsibius dujardini, water bear (2015)

Molluscs
 Acanthopleura granulata, chiton (2020)
Achatina fulica, giant African snail (2019)
 Architeuthis dux, giant squid (2020)
 Argopecten purpuratus, peruvian scallop (2018)
 Bathymodiolus platifrons, seep mussel (2017
 Biomphalaria glabrata, a medically important air-breathing freshwater snail in the family Planorbidae (2017)
 Biomphalaria straminea, Ramshorn snail (2022)
 Candidula unifasciata, Land snail (2021) 
 Chlamys farreri, Zhikong scallop (2017)
 Crassostrea gigas, Pacific oyster (2012)
 Dreissena rostriformis, Quagga mussel (2019)
 Euprymna scolopes, Hawaiian bobtail squid (2019)
 Elysia chlorotica, a solar-powered sea slug (2019)
 Haliotis discus hannai, pacific abalone (2017)
Hapalochlaena maculosa, Southern blue-ringed octopus (2020)
 Conus ventricosus, Mediterranean cone snail (2021)
 Lottia gigantea, owl limpet (2013)
 Limnoperna fortunei, invasive golden mussel (2017)
 Modiolus philippinarum, shallow water mussel (2017)
 Mytilus galloprovincialis, Mediterranean mussel (2016)
 Octopus bimaculoides, California two-spot octopus (2015)
 Octopus minor, common long-arm octopus (2018
 Octopus vulgaris, common octopus (2019)
 Patinopecten yessoensis, Yesso scallop (2017)
 Pecten maximus, Great scallop (2020)
 Pinctada fucata, Pearl oyster (2012)
 Plakobranchus ocellatus, Kleptoplastic sea slug (2021)
 Pomacea canaliculata, golden apple snail (2018)
 Ruditapes philippinarum, Manila clam (2017)
 Saccostrea glomerata, Sydney rock oyster (2018)
 Scapharca broughtonii, Blood clam (2019)
 Venustaconcha ellipsiformis, freshwater mussel (2018)

Platyhelminthes
 Clonorchis sinensis, liver fluke (human pathogen) (draft 2011)
 Echinococcus granulosus, tapeworm (dog pathogen) (2013, 2013)
 Echinococcus multilocularis, tapeworm (2013)
 Hymenolepis microstoma, tapeworm (2013)
 Schistosoma haematobium, schistosome (human pathogen) (2012 2019)
 Schistosoma japonicum, schistosome (human pathogen) (2009)
 Schistosoma mansoni, schistosome (human pathogen) (2009, 2012)
 Schmidtea mediterranea, planarian (model organism) (2006)
 Taenia solium, tapeworm (2013)

Nematodes
 Ancylostoma ceylanicum, zoonotic hookworm infecting both humans and other mammals (2015)
 Ascaris suum, pig-infecting giant roundworm, closely related to human-infecting giant roundworm Ascaris lumbricoides (2011)
 Brugia malayi (Strain:TRS), human-infecting filarial parasite (2007)
 Bursaphelenchus xylophilus, infects pine trees (2011)
 Caenorhabditis angaria (Strain:PS1010) (2010)
 Caenorhabditis brenneri, a gonochoristic (male-female obligate) species more closely related to C. briggsae than C. elegans
 Caenorhabditis briggsae (2003)
 Caenorhabditis elegans (Strain:Bristol N2), model organism (1998)
 Caenorhabditis remanei, a gonochoristic (male-female obligate) species more closely related to C. briggsae than C. elegans
 Dirofilaria immitis, dog-infecting filarial parasite (2012)
 Globodera pallida, plant pathogen (2014)
 Haemonchus contortus, blood-feeding parasite infecting sheep and goats (2013)
 Heterodera glycines, soybean cyst nematode (2019)
 Heterorhabditis bacteriophora, (2013)
 Loa loa, human-infecting filarial parasite (2013)
 Meloidogyne hapla, northern root-knot nematode (plant pathogen) (2008)
 Meloidogyne incognita, southern root-knot nematode (plant pathogen) (2008)
 Necator americanus, human-infecting hookworm (2014)
 Onchocerca volvulus, human-infecting filarial parasite
 Pristionchus pacificus, model invertebrate (2008)
 Romanomermis culicivorax, entomopathogenic nematode that invades larvae of various mosquito species (2013)
 Schistosoma haematobium, urinary blood fluke infecting humans (2019)
 Trichuris suis, pig-infecting whipworm (2014)
 Trichuris muris, mouse-infecting whipworm (2014)
 Trichuris trichiura, human-infecting whipworm (2014)
 Wuchereria bancrofti, human-infecting filarial parasite

Annelids
 Capitella teleta, polychaete (2007, 2013)
 Helobdella robusta, leech (2007, 2013)
 Eisenia fetida, earthworm (2015, 2016)
 Paraescarpia echinospica, deep-sea tubeworm (2021,)

Bryozoa
 Bugula neritina, bryozoan (2020,)

Brachiopoda
 Lingula anatina, brachiopod (2015,)

Rotifera
 Adineta vaga, rotifer (2013,)

See also
 List of sequenced bacterial genomes
 List of sequenced archaeal genomes
 List of sequenced eukaryotic genomes
 List of sequenced fungi genomes
 List of sequenced plant genomes
 List of sequenced protist genomes
 List of sequenced plastomes

References

Animal
Biology-related lists